The 1993 SCCA Pro Racing World Challenge season was the fourth running of the Sports Car Club of America's World Challenge series. The D class from 1992 was dropped. Lotus got its final series win, after which the brand would eventually be removed from the American market for several years before returning with the Elise.

Results

References

GT World Challenge America